Keliek Wicaksono (7 July 1978 – 5 January 2021) was an Indonesian visual effect artist.

Keliek won the 2018 Citra Cup and 2018 Maya Cup for the film 212 Warrior (Wiro Sableng). Keliek died at the MRCCC Siloam Hospital, Jakarta due to blood cancer.

Filmography

Source : Keliek Wicaksono

Awards and nominations

Source : Keliek Wicaksono

References

1978 births
2021 deaths
Visual effects artists
Citra Award winners
Deaths from blood cancer
Deaths from cancer in Indonesia